Walter Bernard "Wally" Hess (October 28, 1894August 30, 1963) was a professional American football running back in the National Football League. He played six seasons for the Hammond Pros, with three of those seasons as a player-coach.

1894 births
1963 deaths
Sportspeople from Hammond, Indiana
Players of American football from Indiana
American football halfbacks
American football fullbacks
American football quarterbacks
Indiana Hoosiers football players
Hammond Pros players